Carlo Alberto Lodi (28 October 1936 – 14 January 2001) was an Italian sports shooter. He competed in the skeet event at the 1972 Summer Olympics.

References

1936 births
2001 deaths
Italian male sport shooters
Olympic shooters of Italy
Shooters at the 1972 Summer Olympics
Sportspeople from Modena